Songo (Nsongo) is a Bantu language of Angola. It is similar to North Mbundu, and is often considered a dialect of that language. The true relationship may be a regional influence since it has been suggested that Nsongo and Teke, and its relatives, are close (Nurse 2003).

References

Teke-Mbere languages
Kimbundu languages